This is a list of electoral division results for the Australian 1993 federal election in the state of Western Australia.

Overall results

Results by division

Brand

Canning

Cowan

Curtin

Forrest

Fremantle

Kalgoorlie

Moore

O'Connor

Pearce

Perth

Stirling

Swan

Tangney

See also 

 Members of the Australian House of Representatives, 1993–1996

References 

Western Australia 1993